Tushnet is a surname. Notable people with the surname include:

Eve Tushnet (born 1978), American Catholic author and blogger
Mark Tushnet (born 1945), American legal scholar
Rebecca Tushnet (born 1973), American legal scholar, daughter of Mark and sister of Eve